Australosepsis is a genus of flies in the family Sepsidae.

Species
Australosepsis frontalis (Walker, 1860)
Australosepsis inusitata Iwasa, 2008
Australosepsis niveipennis (Becker, 1903)

References

Sepsidae
Diptera of Asia
Diptera of Australasia
Taxa named by John Russell Malloch
Brachycera genera